Freedom of Speech is the second album by British rapper Speech Debelle. The record was recorded in London, United Kingdom and produced entirely by Kwes. It was her second album release on Big Dada Recordings.

Reception
At Metacritic, which assigns a weighted average score out of 100 to reviews from mainstream critics, Freedom of Speech received an average score of 62% based on 17 reviews, indicating "generally favorable reviews".

The album prompted Trebuchet Magazine to describe Debelle as 'a fiery, if naïve, seeker of justice and truth', and said "she has a cracked lusciousness to her voice that strongly recalls Martina Topley-Bird's most meltingly sexy moments on Tricky's Maxinquaye."

MTV gave the album 5/5 stars, and said, "What makes this a truly great hip hop album is that her words, piling up on one another, take on the quality of incantations — and that those incantations take on a life of their own." According to AllMusic in a review, "Speech Debelle is now the most interesting and possibly the most exciting British MC on the scene."

Track listing

References

External links

 

2012 albums
Big Dada albums
Speech Debelle albums
Albums produced by Kwes